Zutta may refer to:

Derekh Eretz Zutta, non-canonical tractate of the Babylonian Talmud
Devarim Zutta, midrash to Deuteronomy which is no longer extant except in references by later authorities
Seder Olam Zutta, anonymous chronicle, called "Zuṭa" to distinguish it from the older Seder 'Olam Rabbah
Shir ha-Shirim Zutta, midrash, or, rather, homiletic commentary, on Canticles
Sifre Zutta, midrash on the Book of Numbers